Ușurei may refer to:

 Ușurei, a village in Răcăria Commune, Rîșcani District, Moldova
 Ușurei, a village in Șușani Commune, Vâlcea County, Romania